The 2022 Michigan Attorney General election was held on November 8, 2022, to elect the Attorney General of the state of Michigan. Incumbent Democratic Attorney General Dana Nessel ran for re-election to a second term. She was first elected in 2018 with 49.0% of the vote.

Michigan does not hold partisan primaries for statewide offices other than governor. Instead, the state parties hold conventions in August to nominate candidates for the general election. Party nomination conventions were held on April 9 for the Michigan Democratic Party and April 23 for the Michigan Republican Party.

In August 2022, Reuters reported that presumptive Republican nominee Matthew DePerno "led a team that gained unauthorized access to voting equipment while hunting for evidence to support former President Donald Trump’s false election-fraud claims" following the 2020 election. Gaining unauthorized access to voting machines is a felony in Michigan. Current Michigan Attorney General Nessel is requesting the appointment of an independent specialist prosecutor to investigate DePerno and his team.

Democratic convention

Candidates

Nominee 
 Dana Nessel, incumbent attorney general

Endorsements

Republican convention

Candidates

Nominee 
 Matthew DePerno, private attorney (endorsed by state party)

Eliminated at convention
 Ryan Berman, state representative from the 39th district
 Tom Leonard, former Speaker of the Michigan House of Representatives and nominee in 2018

Endorsements

General election

Predictions

Endorsements

Polling 
Graphical summary

Dana Nessel vs. Tom Leonard

Fundraising

Results

Notes

Partisan clients

References

External links 
 Matthew DePerno (R) for Attorney General
 Dana Nessel (D) for Attorney General

Attorney General
Michigan Attorney General elections
Michigan